Acrotaeniacantha is a genus of tephritid  or fruit flies in the family Tephritidae.

Species
Acrotaeniacantha radiosa Hering, 1939

References

Tephritinae
Tephritidae genera
Taxa named by Friedrich Georg Hendel
Diptera of South America